Alsing Emanuel Andersen (5 February 1893 – 5 December 1962) was a Danish social democrat politician.  Andersen served as the Minister of Defense (1935–1940) for Denmark. From 8 July 1940 to 1945, he served as the vice chairman of the Danish Social Democratic Party, and as the acting chairman of the party from the death of Thorvald Stauning (3 May 1942) until the end of the Nazi occupation of Denmark in 1945.  Andersen briefly returned to national politics as the Minister of the Interior from 13 to 23 November 1947.

He later served as the second President of the Socialist International from 1957 to 1962. His other post-war activities include acting as a chairman for the United Nations Commission appointed to investigate the Hungarian Revolution of 1956.

References

Skou, Kaare R (2005). Dansk politik A-Å . Aschehoug, pp. 92–93. .

1893 births
1962 deaths
Danish Defence Ministers
Danish Finance Ministers
Danish Interior Ministers
Presidents of the Socialist International
Members of the Folketing
Members of the Executive of the Labour and Socialist International
Politicians from Copenhagen